The following is a list of notable people who attended or graduated from the University of Colorado Boulder.

Nobel laureates faculty and staff
 Thomas R. Cech, Nobel laureate in Chemistry in 1989
 Stanley Cohen, Nobel laureate in Physiology or Medicine in 1986
 Eric Allin Cornell, Nobel laureate in Physics in 2001
 John L. Hall, Nobel laureate in Physics in 2005
 Herbert Kroemer, Nobel laureate in Physics in 2000
 Carl Wieman, Nobel laureate in Physics in 2001
 David J. Wineland, Nobel laureate in Physics in 2012
 Muhammad Yunus, recipient of the Nobel Peace Prize in 2006

Nobel laureates alumni
 Sidney Altman, Nobel laureate in Chemistry in 1989
 Craig Mello, Nobel laureate in Physiology or Medicine in 2006
 Norman Ramsey, Nobel laureate in Physics in 1989
 Ellen Johnson Sirleaf, co-recipient of the Nobel Peace Prize in 2011
 Jennifer Doudna, Nobel laureate in Chemistry in 2020

Notable faculty and staff
 Waleed Abdalati, scientist, Chief Scientist of NASA
 Patricia A. Adler, professor emerita of sociology 
 Bernard Amadei, civil engineer, founder of Engineers Without Borders
 Mark Amerika, artist and author
 Fred Anderson, historian, author of The Crucible of War
 Albert Allen Bartlett, physicist, popular writer on exponential growth in populations and energy resources
 Petr Beckmann, physicist, engineer
 Stan Brakhage, filmmaker
 Sara Branham Matthews, microbiologist
 Storm Bull, Professor Emeritus at the College of Music and Head of the Division of Piano
 Adolf Busemann, pioneering aerospace engineer
 Sarvadaman Chowla, mathematician
 Ward Churchill, former ethnic studies professor noted for inflammatory statements dealing with 9/11, dismissed from CU-Boulder 2007
 Robert T. Craig, communication theorist and author of Communication Theory as a Field
 William Duane, physicist
 Max Mapes Ellis, explorer and physiologist
 Larry Esposito, discoverer of Saturn's fourth ring
 Charbel Farhat, Chairman of the Department of Aeronautics and Astronautics Stanford University
 George Gamow, physicist and cosmologist
 Alice F. Healy, psychologist
 Clayton Heathcock, Professor of Chemistry and Dean of the College of Chemistry at the University of California, Berkeley
 Robert Hill, harpsichordist and fortepianist
 Linda Hogan, Native American poet, storyteller, academic, playwright, novelist, environmentalist and writer of short stories
 Janet L. Jacobs, gender and religion sociologist
 Deborah S. Jin, physicist
 Daniel Kellogg, composer
 Patricia Nelson Limerick, historian and occasional New York Times columnist
 Morris Massey, Professor of Marketing, marketing innovator, and Fortune 500 consultant
 Margaret Murnane, physicist, pioneer of femto-second laser research; MacArthur fellow
 Carter Pann, composer
 Steven Pollock, physicist, U.S. Professor of the Year
 Hobart Muir Smith, most published herpetologist of all time; Department of Ecology and Evolutionary Biology
 Joseph R. Tanner, former astronaut
 John Taylor, physicist
 Stanislaw Ulam, mathematician
 James F. Williams, Dean of Libraries
 Muriel Sibell Wolle, artist and author
 James Voss, former astronaut
 Betty Woodman, ceramic artist
 George Woodman, ceramicist, painter, and photographer
 Melanie Yazzie, sculptor, painter, and printmaker
 Brad Goode, jazz trumpeter

Notable alumni

Academia, science and technology
 Len Ackland, professor at the University of Colorado and co-director of the Center for Environmental Journalism
 Elaine Anderson, paleontologist
 George J. Armelagos, Goodrich C. White Professor of Anthropology at Emory University
 John Christian Bailar,  statistician, Professor Emeritus at the University of Chicago
 Janet Bonnema, civil engineer
 Kathryn Bullock, electrochemist
 Steve Chappell,  aerospace engineer and NASA scientist
 Erica Chenoweth, political scientist, expert on civil resistance movements and faculty member at the Josef Korbel School of International Studies
 Robert Corruccini, biological anthropologist and author of numerous monographs and articles on the theory of malocclusion
Hilda Counts, electrical engineer
 Patrick Curran, professor of quantitative psychology at the University of North Carolina and Director of the L. L. Thurstone Psychometric Laboratory
 Ward Darley, president, University of Colorado
 William E. Davis, former university president and United States Senate candidate
 Vine Deloria, Jr., academic and political author on Native American subjects
 W. Edwards Deming, manufacturing quality expert
 Marla Dowell, physicist, director of NIST Communications Technology Laboratory
 Patricia Louise Dudley, zoologist specializing in copepods
Elsie Eaves, civil engineer
 Steve H. Hanke, professor of economics at Johns Hopkins University, adviser to presidents, currency reformer and commodity and currency trader
 David Haussler, professor, University of California, Santa Cruz
 Gretchen Hofmann, professor of ecological physiology of marine organisms at the University of California, Santa Barbara
 Tom Hornbein, developed the standard breathing mask after climbing Mt. Everest in 1963
 Charles Hoskinson, Mathematician, founder of Cardano and co-founder of Ethereum 
 Moriba Jah, astrodynamicist; associate professor of aerospace engineering and engineering mechanics at the University of Texas at Austin; Core Faculty of the Institute for Computational Engineering and Sciences; former spacecraft navigator for NASA's Jet Propulsion Laboratory
 Alan Kay, computer scientist, Turing Award winner
 Elisabeth Kubler-Ross, Swiss-born psychiatrist and the author of the groundbreaking book On Death and Dying
 Ron Larson, professor of mathematics at Penn State Erie, The Behrend College
 Emory Lindquist, Rhodes scholar, Swedish American historian, President of Bethany College and Wichita State University
 Elizabeth (Alker) Lisot-Nelson, professor of art history, University of Texas at Tyler
 Christopher McKay, planetary scientist at NASA Ames Research Center
 Theodore Harold Maiman, demonstrated the first laser
 Tom Maniatis, Edelma Professor of Biochemistry and Molecular Biophysics at the Columbia University College of Physicians and Surgeons
Lou Alta Melton, civil engineer and bridge engineer
 Kenneth Miller, biologist at Brown University
 Kathe Perez, speech-language pathologist 
 Ralph Prator, first president of California State University, Northridge
 Philip Radovic, podiatric surgeon
 Kay Schallenkamp, President of Emporia State University, and later Black Hills State University
 Leon Silver, geologist at California Institute of Technology, past president of Geological Society of America, trained Apollo astronauts in field geology
 Gary Stormo, geneticist and pioneer of bioinformatics and genomics
 Michael T. Voorhees, entrepreneur, engineer, designer, geographer, and aeronaut

Arts and film
 3OH!3, electronic music group
 Josephine Antoine, coloratura soprano with the Metropolitan Opera
 Brandon Barnes, drummer for the band Rise Against and Pinhead Circus
 Rodney Carswell, painter
 Charles L. Bestor, composer and music educator
 Chairlift, electronic-pop group
 Derek Cianfrance, screenwriter and film director
 Lydia Cornell, actress, author
 Eli Craig, screenwriter and film director
 Eric Darnell, director
Joey Diaz, comedian
 Brian Dietzen, actor
 Lisa Donovan, actress and writer
 Patricia Elliott, actress
 Joe Flanigan, actor
 Tanner Foust, television host, stunt driver, professional racing driver
 Nicole Fox, model, winner of America's Next Top Model, Cycle 13
 Drew Goddard, film and television screenwriter, director and producer
 Jake Goldberg, actor
 Dave Grusin, composer, winner of three Academy and three Grammy awards
 Heather Hach, wrote the screenplay for the 2003 remake of Freaky Friday and the book of the Broadway musical Legally 
Blonde
 Erinn Hayes, actress
 Jonah Hill, actor
 David "GrandPooBear" Hunt, speedrunner and streamer well known for retro Super Mario games
 Angus T. Jones, actor
 Shawn King, drummer, percussionist, trumpeter, accordionist, organist for the band DeVotchKa
 R. J. Kern, artist and photographer
 Chaney Kley, actor
 Land of the Loops, electronica musician
 William Lewis, opera tenor and academic
 Larry Linville, actor (M*A*S*H)
 Low vs Diamond, rock band
Erin Macdonald, science consultant for Star Trek
 Ross Marquand, actor 
 Christopher Meloni, actor
 Glenn Miller, composer, big band leader
 Joan Moment, painter and educator
 Nathaniel Motte, singer, songwriter, producer, performer, film composer, instrumentalist, and playwright
 Thomas Noel, historian
 Peter O'Fallon, director, producer and writer
 Trey Parker, co-creator of South Park
 Caroline Polachek, singer-songwriter
 Robert Redford, actor (did not graduate), Oscar winner, founder of the Sundance Film Festival
 Dean Reed, actor, singer and songwriter, director, and social activist
Joe Safdie, poet
 Aaron Simpson, Emmy-nominated animation producer
 Susan Arnout Smith, award-winning playwright and novelist
 Lisa Solberg, artist
 Paul Soldner, artist
 Matt Stone, co-creator of South Park
 Eric Stough, producer and the director of animation on South Park
 Steve Taylor, singer/songwriter and film director
 Dalton Trumbo, writer, Academy Award winner
 Joan Van Ark, actress
 Townes Van Zandt, country-folk singer-songwriter, withdrew in his sophomore year
Malia White, Below Deck Med cast member
 Linda Williams, professor of film studies at the University of California, Berkeley
 Chris Wood, electronic musician
 Pamela Z, composer, performer, and media artist
 Dean Zanuck, motion picture executive and producer

Astronauts
 Loren Acton, NASA astronaut
 Patrick Baudry, CNES astronaut
 Vance D. Brand, NASA astronaut
 Scott Carpenter, NASA astronaut in second orbital flight (fourth crewed) of Project Mercury
 Kalpana Chawla, NASA astronaut, died on Columbia
 Takao Doi, NASA astronaut
 Samuel T. Durrance, NASA astronaut
 John Herrington, NASA astronaut
 Richard Hieb, NASA astronaut
 Marsha Ivins, NASA astronaut
 John M. Lounge, NASA astronaut
 George Nelson, NASA astronaut
 Ellison Onizuka, NASA astronaut, died on Challenger in January 1986
 Stuart Roosa, NASA astronaut, flew on Apollo 14
 Ronald M. Sega, NASA astronaut
 Steven Swanson, NASA astronaut
 Jack Swigert, NASA astronaut, flew on Apollo 13
 James Voss, NASA astronaut

Athletics
 Bobby Anderson, former NFL running back for the Denver Broncos
 Dick Anderson, former NFL safety for the Miami Dolphins
 Tom Ashworth, former NFL offensive tackle for the Seattle Seahawks
 Sal Aunese, Big Eight Newcomer of the Year
Chidobe Awuzie, NFL cornerback for the Dallas Cowboys
 David Bakhtiari, NFL offensive tackle for the Green Bay Packers
 Justin Bannan, former NFL defensive tackle for the Denver Broncos
 Dede Barry, cyclist, won silver in the 2004 Summer Olympics in the women's time trial
 Mitch Berger, former NFL punter
 Greg Biekert, former NFL linebacker for the Oakland Raiders and Minnesota Vikings
 Eric Bieniemy, former NFL running back and offensive coordinator for the Kansas City Chiefs
 Chauncey Billups, Detroit Pistons of the NBA, 2004 NBA Finals MVP
 Abhinav Bindra, shooter, won gold for India in the 2008 Summer Olympics in the 10 metre air rifle
 Joan Birkland, Colorado state women's amateur golf and tennis champion
 Jeremy Bloom, Olympic Skier (played football for Colorado), drafted by Philadelphia Eagles
 Cliff Branch, former wide receiver with the Oakland Raiders
 Tyler Brayton, NFL defensive end, plays for the Carolina Panthers
 Carlon Brown, basketball player, 2013-14 top scorer in the Israel Basketball Premier League
 Chris Brown, former NFL running back for the Houston Texans
 Heidi Browning, NHL chief marketing officer
 Rae Carruth, former wide receiver for the Carolina Panthers
 Franklin Clarke, former All-Pro wide receiver for the Dallas Cowboys
 Emma Coburn, mid-distance runner, Olympian 2016 Bronze Medalist Steeplechase, 2017 World Champion 
 Mark Cooney, former NFL linebacker for the Green Bay Packers
 Joe Cooper, former NBA center
 Mason Crosby, NFL kicker for the Green Bay Packers
 Alan Culpepper, runner, Olympian, 2000 and 2004
 Koy Detmer, former NFL quarterback
 Boyd Dowler, former NFL wide receiver for the Green Bay Packers
 Jon Embree, former head football coach for the Colorado Buffaloes
 Christian Fauria, NFL tight end for the Carolina Panthers
 Bill Frank, Canadian Football Hall of Fame offensive lineman for the Toronto Argonauts and the Winnipeg Blue Bombers
 Tom Garfinkel, President and CEO of the Miami Dolphins
 David Gibbs, former NFL head coach
 Taylor Gold (born 1993), snowboarder; Olympic bronze medalist
 Adam Goucher, professional runner with Nike, Olympian 2000
 Kara Goucher, runner, Olympian 2008, 2012
 Daniel Graham, former NFL tight end for the Denver Broncos
 Alex Gurney, professional auto racing driver
 Andre Gurode, former All-Pro center for the Dallas Cowboys
 D.J. Hackett, former NFL wide receiver for the Carolina Panthers
 Tyler Hamilton, cyclist with many impressive finishes at the Tour de France, Summer Olympics
 David Harrison, former NBA center
 Don Hasselbeck, former NFL tight end
 Steven J. Hatchell,  president and CEO of the National Football Foundation and College Hall of Fame, Inc.
 Jimmie Heuga, alpine skiing, 1964 Olympic bronze medalist in slalom
 Katie Hnida, football place kicker (graduated from the University of New Mexico)
 Jay Howell, retired Major League Baseball pitcher of 15 years
 Jay Humphries, former NBA guard
 Hale Irwin, golfer, three-time U.S. Open champion
 Brian Iwuh, former NFL linebacker for the Jacksonville Jaguars
 Jonathan Kaye (born 1970), professional golfer on PGA Tour
 Billy Kidd, alpine skiing, 1964 Olympic silver medalist in slalom, 1970 World Champion (combined)
 Joe Klopfenstein, former NFL tight end for the Buffalo Bills
 Stuart Krohn (born 1962), professional rugby union player
 Matt Lepsis, former NFL offensive tackle for the Denver Broncos
 Michael Lewis, former All-Pro safety for the San Francisco 49ers
 Phillip Lindsay, NFL running back for the Denver Broncos
 Dave Logan, former NFL receiver, broadcaster
 Eliot Marshall, retired mixed martial arts fighter
 Nikki Marshall, NWSL defender for the Portland Thorns FC
 Scotty McKnight, Former NFL WR for the New York Jets
 Matt Miller, former NFL offensive tackle for the Cleveland Browns
 William Nelson, professional runner, Olympian 2008; Assistant Coach and Recruiting Coordinator for the CU XC/Track & Field Teams
 Isaiah Oliver, NFL cornerback for the Atlanta Falcons
 Tyler Polumbus, former NFL offensive tackle for the Washington Redskins
 Vince Rafferty, former NFL center and guard for the Green Bay Packers
 Marcus Relphorde (born 1988). basketball player in the Israeli National League
 Paul Richardson (American football), former NFL wide receiver for the Seattle Seahawks
 Dathan Ritzenhein, professional runner with Nike, Olympian 2004, 2008, and 2012
 Paul Robinson, professional rock climber
 Bill Roe, former NFL and USFL linebacker
 Spider Sabich, alpine skiing, 1968 Olympian (5th in slalom), and pro champion, 1971 and 1972
 Rashaan Salaam, former NFL running back, 1994 Heisman Trophy winner
 Cory Sandhagen, mixed martial artist who is currently ranked #5 in the Ultimate Fighting Championship bantamweight rankings
 Brendan Schaub, former NFL candidate; retired mixed martial artist for the Ultimate Fighting Championship;stand-up comedian
 Laviska Shenault, NFL wide receiver for the Jacksonville Jaguars
 Jenny Simpson, 1500 meter runner, Olympian 2008, 2012, 2016 Bronze Medalist
 Jimmy Smith (cornerback), NFL cornerback for the Baltimore Ravens
 Nate Solder, NFL offensive tackle for the New York Giants
 John Stearns, former catcher for Philadelphia Phillies and NY Mets
 Alexandra Stevenson, women's tennis player
 Kordell Stewart, former NFL quarterback for the Pittsburgh Steelers
 Bill Symons, former CFL All-Star for the Toronto Argonauts 
 Debi Thomas, Olympic figure skater in 1988
 Tedric Thompson, NFL safety for the Kansas City Chiefs
 Bill Toomey, Olympic gold medalist in the 1968 decathlon
 Rachel Wacholder - model and beach volleyball player
 Ward Walsh, former NFL running back
 Scott Wedman, former NBA forward
 Michael Westbrook, former NFL wide receiver
 Terrence Wheatley, former NFL cornerback for the New England Patriots, first-team All-Big 12
 Damen Wheeler, former NFL and XFL cornerback
 Alfred Williams, former NFL linebacker, 1990 Butkus Award winner
 Ahkello Witherspoon, NFL cornerback for the San Francisco 49ers
 John Wooten, All-American; played for the Cleveland Browns; former vice president/director for the Philadelphia Eagles; assistant director for the Baltimore Ravens
 Max "Soligo" Soong, pro League of Legends player; Evil Geniuses academy mid laner; formerly played for 100 Thieves and Dignitas (esports) in the LCS

Business and economy
 Mohamed Al-Mady, President of SABIC
 Jake Burton Carpenter, founder of Burton Snowboards
 John Dendahl, retired business executive and member of the 1960 US Olympic ski team
 Steve Ells, founder, chairman, and CEO of Chipotle Mexican Grill
 Thorleif Enger, former boss of Yara International; indicted in 2012 in relation to the company's business practices in Libya
 Richard S. Fuld, former Lehman Brothers, chairman and CEO
 Tim Gill, founder and former Chairman of Quark, Inc.
 Ron Gordon, former president of Atari
 Brent Handler, entrepreneur and pioneer of the destination club industry
 Michael Karlan, founder of the nation's largest social and networking group, Professionals in the City
 David Kennedy, co-founder of Wieden + Kennedy advertising agency, known for its 1980s "Just Do It" campaign for Nike
 Matt Larson, founder and CEO of Confio Software
 Sanford McDonnell, President of McDonnell Aircraft Corporation
 Chris Myers, former Vice President of Business Development at Lockheed Martin and former Mayor of Medford, New Jersey
 Scott Oki, former senior vice-president of sales and marketing for Microsoft who conceived and built Microsoft's international operations
 Lucy Sanders, CEO and co-founder of the National Center for Women & Information Technology
 Maria Barkman Black, President and CEO of Automatic Data Processing ADP, Inc.

Journalism
 John Branch, sports writer for The New York Times and recipient of the 2013 Pulitzer Prize for Feature Writing
 Dave Briggs, co-host of Fox & Friends Weekend, Fox News Channel
 Benedict Carey, medical and science writer for The New York Times
 Dan Carlin, television/radio journalist and podcaster 
 Linda Chavez, political analyst and Fox News commentator
 Kevin Corke, White House correspondent, Fox News
 Tom Costello, NBC News, Washington-based correspondent
 Chris Fowler, ESPN
 Jim Gray, sports reporter
 Tom Keene, editor-at-large for Bloomberg News
 Herb Keinon, columnist and journalist for The Jerusalem Post
 Joe Kernen, CNBC anchor
 Zachery Kouwe, former financial journalist
 Robert Palmer, Emmy Award winner, news editor and executive editor
 Carl Quintanilla, CNBC News anchor
 Lara Jo Regan, documentary and fine art photographer, photojournalist, author, winner of World Press Photo of the Year
 Rick Reilly, ESPN commentator and former Sports Illustrated writer, ten-time National Sportswriter of the Year
 Jonathan Weil, columnist for Bloomberg News and former writer for the Wall Street Journal

Law
 Christine Arguello (born 1955), federal court judge, Denver, CO
 Roger S. Burdick, Chief Justice of the Idaho Supreme Court  
 Howard Jenkins Jr., labor lawyer and civil servant
 Louis O. Kelso, inventor of the employee stock ownership plan
 William Lee Knous, former associate justice of the Colorado Supreme Court
 Ashby Pate, Associate Justice of the Supreme Court of Palau
 Wiley Rutledge, former Associate Justice of the U.S. Supreme Court
 John Suthers, former Attorney General of Colorado
Bethuel M. Webster, lawyer and founder of Webster & Sheffield
 Byron White, former associate justice of the U.S. Supreme Court

Literature
Molly Bloom, author
Ed Dorn, poet
 John Fante, author of Ask the Dust
 Mark Leyner, author
 Jean Stafford, Pulitzer prize winner
 Luís Alberto Urrea, Mexican American poet, novelist, and essayist
 Carrie Vaughn, author
 Jack Williamson PhD, science fiction author and educator

Military
 Ben Connable, retired Marine Major, professor at the Frederick S. Pardee RAND Graduate School
 Roger A. Lalich, U.S. National Guard general
 Harold R. Vague, Air Force major general  and Judge Advocate General of the United States Air Force
 David D. Barrett, Army Colonel, representative of the Dixie Mission in China, and professor at the University of Colorado.

Politics
 Joe Neguse, U.S. Representative for Colorado
Gordon L. Allott, former U.S. Senator from Colorado (1955–1973)
 Bob Beauprez, former U.S. Representative
 Donald G. Brotzman, former U.S. Representative for Colorado
 Hank Brown, U.S. Senator; U.S. Representative; former president of the University of Northern Colorado, and the University of Colorado system
 Kate Brown, 38th Governor of Oregon and former Secretary of State
 George Alfred Carlson, 20th Governor of Colorado
 Morgan Carroll, Colorado State Senate Majority Leader
 Mary Ann Casey, Ambassador to Algeria, Tunisia
 Mike Coffman, U.S. Representative for Colorado
 John J. Easton, Jr., Attorney General of Vermont
 Tsakhiagiin Elbegdorj, leader of non-violent revolution that brought democracy to Mongolia, President of Mongolia, Prime Minister of Mongolia
 Maria Handley, member-at-large of the Democratic National Committee
 Greg Harris, member of Illinois House of Representatives
 Vicki Huddleston, Ambassador to Madagascar, Mali, Chief of U.S. Interests Section Havana, Cuba 
 Wayne Harold Johnson (Master of Public Administration), Republican member of both houses, consecutively, of the Wyoming State Legislature from Cheyenne, 1993 to 2017
 Mark Leno California politician
 Karen Middleton, member, Colorado House of Representatives
 Ed Perlmutter, U.S. Representative for Colorado
 Bill Ritter (Colorado Law School), Denver District Attorney, Advisor to the U.S. Attorney General, Governor of Colorado (D)
 Roy Romer (Colorado Law School), former Colorado governor
 Kenneth Rutherford, activist in the International Campaign to Ban Landmines
 Ellen Johnson Sirleaf, President of Liberia
 Richard A. Sossi, Maryland politician
 John Suthers, Mayor of Colorado Springs
 Llewellyn Thompson, Ambassador to USSR, consul to Moscow, received the Medal of Freedom
 Purnomo Yusgiantoro, Minister of Defense of Indonesia, former secretary general of OPEC

Other
 Lynne Cheney, wife of former U.S. Vice President Dick Cheney; author of children's books
 Stanley Grenz, Christian theologian and ethicist in the Baptist tradition
 J. Edward Guinan, community activist, author of the first DC Statehood referendum, and founder of the Community for Creative Non-Violence
 Nancy Spungen, girlfriend of punk rock singer Sid Vicious

Fictional 

 Kim Wexler, character in Better Call Saul

References

University of Colorado Boulder alumni
University of Colorado alumni